Seynesia is a genus of fungi in the family Cainiaceae.

The genus was circumscribed by Pier Andrea Saccardo in Syll. Fungorum vol.2 on page 668 in 1883.

The genus name of Seynesia is in honour of Jules de Seynes (1833–1912), who was a French physician, botanist and mycologist, and Professor of Natural history at the Medical faculty within the University of Paris. He previously also was at the University of Montpellier.

Species
As accepted by Species Fungorum;

Seynesia apuleiae 
Seynesia araucariae  
Seynesia banksiae 
Seynesia brosimicola 
Seynesia calamicola 
Seynesia circinans 
Seynesia coccoidea 
Seynesia cordiae 
Seynesia costaricensis 
Seynesia cynanchi 
Seynesia echitis 
Seynesia elegantula 
Seynesia ficina 
Seynesia fuscoparaphysata 
Seynesia juruana 
Seynesia licaniae 
Seynesia livistonae 
Seynesia hammariana 
Seynesia heteropteridis 
Seynesia megas 
Seynesia melaleucae 
Seynesia nobilis 
Seynesia oleae 
Seynesia palmicola 
Seynesia petiolicola 
Seynesia santanderiana 
Seynesia scutellum 

Former species;

 S. alstoniae  = Arnaudiella alstoniae Ascomycota
 S. asterinoides  = Prillieuxina asterinoides Asterinaceae
 S. atkinsonii  = Kirschsteiniothelia atkinsonii Kirschsteiniotheliaceae
 S. australis  = Asterostomella australis Asterinaceae
 S. balansae  = Asterina balansae Asterinaceae
 S. brachystoma  = Parasterina brachystoma Asterinaceae
 S. brasiliensis  = Opasterinella brasiliensis Microthyriaceae
 S. caronae  = Pycnoseynesia caronae Ascomycota
 S. chilensis  = Seynesiola chilensis Microthyriaceae
 S. clavispora  = Prillieuxina clavispora Asterinaceae
 S. coccolobae  = Cocconia coccolobae Parmulariaceae
 S. drimydis  = Leveillella drimydis Asterinaceae
 S. epidendri  = Asterinella epidendri Microthyriaceae
 S. erumpens  = Astrosphaeriella erumpens Astrosphaeriellaceae
 S. eugeniae  = Ferrarisia eugeniae Parmulariaceae
 S. grandis  = Palawania grandis Palawaniaceae
 S. guaranitica  = Asterina guaranitica Asterinaceae
 S. humiriae  = Prillieuxina humiriae Asterinaceae
 S. ilicina  = Dimerium ilicinum Parodiopsidaceae
 S. iochromatis  = Cyclotheca iochromatis Microthyriaceae
 S. ipomoeae  = Ferrarisia ipomoeae Parmulariaceae
 S. juniperi  = Seynesiella juniperi Microthyriaceae
 S. marmellensis  = Asterina marmellensis Asterinaceae
 S. megas var. macrospora  = Seynesia megas 
 S. melastomataceae  = Asterina melastomatacearum Asterinaceae
 S. microthyrioides  = Phaeothyriolum microthyrioides Microthyriaceae
 S. montana  = Trichopeltella montana Microthyriaceae
 S. nebulosa  = Microthyrium nebulosum Microthyriaceae
 S. orbiculata  = Palawaniella orbiculata Parmulariaceae
 S. palustris  = Ceriophora palustris Amphisphaeriaceae
 S. polystachyae  = Arnaudiella polystachyae Ascomycota
 S. schroeteri  = Asterolibertia schroeteri Asterinaceae
 S. serrulata  = Roussoella serrulata Roussoellaceae
 S. submegas  = Asterina submegas Asterinaceae

References

External links
Index Fungorum

Xylariales
Taxa named by Pier Andrea Saccardo